Civitas Tropaensium was a Roman castrum situated in Scythia Minor in modern Constanța County, Romania. Its site is now the modern settlement of Adamclisi. It was colonized with Roman veterans of the Dacian Wars, was the largest Roman city of Scythia Minor and became a municipium around 200AD.

In 109 AD, a monument named Tropaeum Traiani was built to commemorate the Roman Empire's victories over the Dacians.

The city was destroyed by the Goths, but it was rebuilt during Constantine the Great's rule with improved defensive walls. Civitas Tropaensium survived until the Avars sacked it in 587, after which it ceased to be an important city of Dobruja and was no longer mentioned for seven hundred years.

External links 

Former populated places in Eastern Europe
Roman legionary fortresses in Romania
History of Dobruja